Energy in the Netherlands describes energy and electricity production, consumption and import in the Netherlands.  Electricity sector in the Netherlands is the main article of electricity in the Netherlands.

Overview

Transition away from natural gas
To reduce its greenhouse emissions, the government of the Netherlands is subsidizing a transition away from natural gas for all homes in the country by 2050. In Amsterdam, no new residential gas accounts are allowed as of July 1, 2018, and all homes in the city are expected to be converted by 2040.  Electric stoves are expected to replace gas stoves.

District heating is expected to replace natural gas for the heating of buildings.  The Amsterdam area is already supplied to some degree with heat from waste incineration. New sources are expected to include geothermal energy, surface waters, and data centers.

See also

 Renewable energy in the Netherlands
 Electricity sector in the Netherlands

References

External links
 Flowdiagram of Energy in the Netherlands
 Energy Information Platform